Andreas Weikenstorfer (born 20 January 1958) is a German bobsledder. He competed in the two man event at the 1984 Winter Olympics.

References

External links
 

1958 births
Living people
German male bobsledders
Olympic bobsledders of West Germany
Bobsledders at the 1984 Winter Olympics
People from Weilheim-Schongau
Sportspeople from Upper Bavaria